Kathiri, officially the Kathiri State of Seiyun, was a sultanate in the Hadhramaut region of the southern Arabian Peninsula, in what is now part of Yemen and the Dhofari region of Oman.

History
The Kathiri State was established in 1395 by Badr as-Sahab ibn al-Habrali Bu Tuwairik, who ruled until . The Kathiri conquered Ash-Shihr in the 1460s.
The country inhabited by this tribe was formerly extensive, reaching from the Aulaqi districts on the west to the Maliri tribe on the east, and including the seaports of Mukalla and Shihr. Civil wars led to the interference of the Yafai, and much of the Kathiri territory came under the sway of the Kasadi and Qu'aiti. The Kathiris were eventually restricted to a small inland portion of Hadhramaut with their capital at Seiyun (Say'un).

At the end of 1883, Sultan Abdulla bin Salih, one of the Kathiri Shaikhs, visited the Resident at Aden. His principal object was to ascertain what attitude the British Government would maintain in the event of the Kathiri attacking the Qu'aiti with a view to repossessing themselves of the ports of Shihr and Mukalla. Abdulla bin Salih also visited Zanzibar with intent to intrigue with the ex-Naqib of Mukalla, from whom however, he failed to obtain any material assistance.

The Government of India in March 1884 directed that the Kathiri be warned that an attack upon Shihr and Mukalla would he viewed with grave displeasure, and that, if necessary, a gun-boat would he sent to support the Qu'aiti ruler. The Jamadar of Shihr and Mukalla was subsequently assured in the most public manner that Government would support him in the event of any attack on his ports.

In 1895 the Kathiri captured the port at Dhufar driving out the Governor, who retired to Mirbat. In 1897 the port was recaptured.
Removed
In 1918 a 'long standing Qu'aiti-Kathiri quarrel was settled, with the assistance of the Aden Residency, by the conclusion of an Agreement between the parties, by which the Kathiri agreed to accept as binding upon them the treaty of 1888 between the Qu'aiti and the British Government and also accepted the arbitration of the British Government in the settlement of future disputes.

Sultan Mansur bin Ghalib died at Mecca in May 1929 and was succeeded by his son Ali bin Mansur.

The Kathiri State declined to join the Federation of South Arabia, but remained under British protection as part of the Protectorate of South Arabia. Al-Husayn ibn Ali, Kathiri sultan since 1949, was overthrown in October 1967, and the following month the former sultanate became part of newly independent South Yemen.

South Yemen united with North Yemen in 1990 to become the Republic of Yemen, but local sheikhs in Yemen are reported to still wield large de facto authority.

The first prime minister in the history of East Timor, Mar'ī al-Kathīrī, is a third generation descendant of immigrants from Kathiri, part of a significant migration of Hadhramis to Southeast Asia in the 19th and 20th centuries.  This is reflected in his name 'Alkatiri'. The Indonesian human rights activist Munir Said Thalib is also a descendant of immigrants from the Kathiris.

References

External links

Flag of Kathiri State
Hubert Herald - Yemen
12 khumsi /khumsiyyah/, 1898: Kathiri State of Seiyun in Hadhramaut

Former sultanates
States in the Aden Protectorate
Protectorate of South Arabia
Arab dynasties
Islamic history of Yemen